Guinea competed at the 2012 Summer Olympics in London, from 27 July to 12 August 2012. This was the nation's tenth appearance at the Olympics, excluding the 1972 Summer Olympics in Munich, and the 1976 Summer Olympics in Montreal because of the African boycott.

Four Guinean athletes were selected to the team, competing only in athletics, judo, and swimming. Heavyweight judoka Facinet Keita was the nation's flag bearer at the opening ceremony. Guinea, however, has yet to win its first ever Olympic medal.

Athletics

Men

Women

Key
Note–Ranks given for track events are within the athlete's heat only
Q = Qualified for the next round
q = Qualified for the next round as a fastest loser or, in field events, by position without achieving the qualifying target
NR = National record
N/A = Round not applicable for the event
Bye = Athlete not required to compete in round

Judo

Guinea has qualified 1 judoka.

Swimming

Guinea has gained a "Universality place" from the FINA.

Women

References

External links
 
 

Nations at the 2012 Summer Olympics
2012
Olympics